The 2007–08 St. Lawrence Saints women's hockey team represented St. Lawrence University in the 2007–08 NCAA Division I women's hockey season. The Saints were coached by Paul Flanagan and play their home games at Appleton Arena. The Saints were a member of the Eastern College Athletic Conference and were unable to win the NCAA Women's Ice Hockey Championship

Regular season

Schedule

Player stats

Awards and honors
Sabrina Harbec, All-America honors (2008)
Annie Guay, All-America honors (2008)

See also
St. Lawrence Saints women's ice hockey

References

Saint Lawrence
St. Lawrence Saints women's ice hockey seasons